Citrus garrawayi, the Mount White lime, is a tree native to the Cape York region of northern Queensland in Australia. It is an understory tree in tropical rainforests.

Fruits are elongated, yellowish-green with green pulp. The fruits are edible but the species is rare and grows in an isolated location, so there has to date been no commercial use of it.

The species is often included in the genus Microcitrus rather than in the genus Citrus.

See also
Citrus taxonomy for Australian and New Guinean species

References

External links

Bushfood
garrawayi
Edible plants
Flora of Queensland
Plants described in 1900
Sapindales of Australia